Chouinard may refer to:

Surname
 Bobby Chouinard, baseball player
 Eric Chouinard, hockey player
 Guy Chouinard, hockey player
 Josée Chouinard, Canadian figure skater
 Julien Chouinard, Puisne Justice of the Canadian Supreme Court
 Marc Chouinard, Canadian hockey player
 Marie Chouinard, dancer, choreographer, founder of the Companie Marie Chouinard
 Mathieu Chouinard, ice hockey player
 Yvon Chouinard, American billionaire founder of Patagonia, a clothing company

Other
 former name of Patagonia, Inc.
 former name of Black Diamond Equipment
 Chouinard Art Institute